"From a Lover to a Friend" is a song by Paul McCartney, featured on his 2001 album Driving Rain.  It was released as a single and spent two weeks on the UK Singles Chart, peaking at #45.  It also reached #6 on the Canadian Singles Chart.  In the U.S. it became the b-side to his single "Freedom" and peaked at #24 on the Billboard Adult Contemporary chart.

Critics saw the song as a ballad in which McCartney tries to come to terms with the death of his wife Linda, singing "let me love again"; McCartney, however, was less certain whom the song was about in an interview on Howard Stern's radio show. The Guardian called it a "masterpiece... so delicate and honest that it sounds pretty much perfect."

"From a Lover to a Friend" was recorded on 27 February 2001 with Paul playing bass and piano, Abe Laboriel, Jr. playing drums, Rusty Anderson on 12-string electric guitar, and Gabe Dixon on piano.

Track listings
7" single
"From a Lover to a Friend" – 3:48
"Riding Into Jaipur" – 4:08

CD single
"From a Lover to a Friend"–  3:49
"From a Lover to a Friend" (David Kahne Remix 1) – 3:44
"From a Lover to a Friend" (David Kahne Remix 2) – 5:27

Cassette single
"From a Lover to a Friend" – 3:48
"Riding Into Jaipur" – 4:08
"From a Lover to a Friend" (David Kahne Remix 2) – 5:27

Charts

Weekly charts

Year-end charts

Notes

External links
 From a Lover to a Friend on Amazon.com
 Release information

Paul McCartney songs
2001 singles
Songs written by Paul McCartney
Song recordings produced by David Kahne
2001 songs
Parlophone singles